Rafael Oller Pereira (born 24 February 1995), known as Rafael Oller, is a Brazilian footballer who plays as an attacking midfielder for Operário Ferroviário.

Club career
Oller was born in Barra Bonita, São Paulo, and joined São Carlos' youth setup in 2013. He made his senior debut on 14 July of that year, aged 18, by coming on as a half-time substitute in a 0–1 home loss against Inter de Limeira, for the year's Copa Paulista.

In June, after impressing with the under-20s, Oller moved to Hellas Verona on loan, but could not play for the club due to paperwork issues. Upon returning, he moved to Santos also on loan.

Oller appeared with the main squad once, being an unused substitute in a 3–0 Copa do Brasil away win against Galvez on 11 May 2016. The following 3 January, he joined URT for the ensuing Campeonato Mineiro.

For the 2018 season, Oller represented Uberaba, URT and América Mineiro's under-23 squad. Promoted to América's first team for the 2019 campaign, he returned to URT for a third spell in February, on loan.

Announced by Uberaba in March 2019, Oller joined Ferroviária instead on 8 May. He moved to Anápolis on 6 January of the following year, playing in the Campeonato Goiano for the club before agreeing to a contract with Portuguesa Santista on 5 August.
In December 2020 Rafael Oller was hired to reinforce the Operário PR for the Série B sequence with a contract  until May 2021  With his good performances, he won the ge.com poll as the most beautiful Serie B goal and was nominated for the 2021 Puskas awards. led the club to renew with the player until December 2021.

Career statistics

References

External links
Futebol de Goyaz profile 

1995 births
Living people
Footballers from São Paulo (state)
Brazilian footballers
Association football midfielders
Campeonato Brasileiro Série D players
São Carlos Futebol Clube players
Santos FC players
União Recreativa dos Trabalhadores players
Uberaba Sport Club players
América Futebol Clube (MG) players
Associação Ferroviária de Esportes players
Anápolis Futebol Clube players
Associação Atlética Portuguesa (Santos) players
People from Barra Bonita, São Paulo